Beytollahi (also Romanized as Beytollāhī) is a village in Kuhenjan Rural District, Kuhenjan District, Sarvestan County, Fars Province, Iran. At the 2006 census, its population was 21, in 5 families.

References 

Populated places in Sarvestan County